Nicolești may refer to several villages in Romania:

 Nicolești, a depopulated village in Berteștii de Jos Commune, Brăila County
 Nicolești, a village in Puiești Commune, Buzău County
 Nicolești, a village in Frumoasa Commune, Harghita County
 Nicolești, a village in Ulieș Commune, Harghita County
 Nicolești, a village in Miloșești Commune, Ialomița County
 Nicolești, a village in Crăciunești Commune, Mureș County
 Nicolești, a village in Olanu Commune, Vâlcea County